Ngcobo, alternatively rendered Engcobo, is a town in the Eastern Cape province of South Africa.

Ngcobo is the main town of the Engcobo Local Municipality, which falls within the Chris Hani District Municipality of the Eastern Cape. It is situated in the western part of the former bantustan of Transkei. Ngcobo is along R61 surrounded by the towns of Cofimvaba, Dutywa, Mthatha, Elliot and Cala. The villages in Ngcobo include Gqaga, Nkwenkwana, Bhokileni, Tshaphile, Mnyolo, Mhlophekazi, Yawa, Sandile, Nkondlo, Clarkebury, Gqobonco, Manzana, Mkhanzi, Qitsi, Mqonci, All Saints, Mjanyana, Deberha, Mbhekeni, Quthubeni, Cefane, Ntibaneni, Nxamagela, Ngxogi, Zabasa, Sinqumeni, Gqaqhala, Sundwane, Gubenxe, Luhewini, Kalinyanga, Sixholosini, Thorha, Goboti and Ntibaneni. Mbashe River separates Ngcobo from Mthatha.

History 
On 1 November 1859, a day known in the Christian calendar as All Saints' Day, Chief Fubu of the amaQwathi met with Archdeacon Waters and the Rev John Gordon of the Society for the Propagation of the Gospel in Foreign Parts (SPG). As a result, they were granted a stretch of land in the Xuka valley, and soon thereafter the All Saints mission station was founded on the site under the leadership of the Rev Gordon. Today All Saints Parish is a cathedral.
In 1876 Walter Stanford arrived at the station to take up his appointment as Resident Magistrate to the amaQwathi. He established the seat of his magistracy some 8 km from the station on a site known locally as Engcobo, a Xhosa term meaning "a green place next to a stream". In 1879 the amaQwathi rose in rebellion and, during the ensuing hostilities, both the mission and the magistracy were burnt to the ground, forcing their residents to flee. Following the surrender of the amaQwathi, the magistracy was re-established at Engcobo in 1881. The town was previously located in Mjanyana, well known as aleper institution.

Traditionally known as emaQwathini (the land of the Qwathi people), the town of Ngcobo has evolved to accommodate many nationalities. Recently, this town is a home to many Chinese, Pakistani, North African traders and more. The first non Xhosa professionals to settle in this area were Indian doctors working at All Saints Hospital and Ghanaian teachers who flooded the whole of the Transkei in the 1980s.

For a long time the town has been regarded as one of the most naturally beautiful towns in the province.For many years Ngcobo was the biggest town in the region serving many smaller towns like Cofimvaba, Tsomo, and Cala and this gave rise to a popular Xhosa saying "INgcobo yidolophu" meaning "Don't take it for granted, Ngcobo is a big town".

Ngcobo has two government hospitals:

All Saints General Hospital and Mjanyana TB Hospital

Ngcobo is the birthplace of former ANC president Alfred Bathini Xuma, ANC stalwart Walter Sisulu, UDF stalwart Canon Mcebisi Xundu, Mondli Gungubele Ekurhuleni Mayor, former wife of Nelson Mandela Evelyn Mase and many who played a significant role in the history of South Africa.

Notable people from Ngcobo
Litha Ncokazi
Hector Bongani Ncokazi
 Sinazo Zaza Ntsenge
 Msimelelo Sondlo
 Sanele Tshongweni
 Amanda Kom
 Walter Sisulu, anti-apartheid activist and Secretary General of the African National Congress (ANC)
 Evelyn Mase, nurse and first wife of the anti-apartheid activist and the future president Nelson Mandela
 Maka Zinyuse
 Mbombini Molteno Sihele, Xhosa Councillor and national poet ("imbongi").
 Nceba Hlangadala
 Clarkebury on the banks of Mbhashe River was home to Nelson Mandela at high school level.
 Zalisile Matiwane
 Chief Zwelihle Mtikrakra
 Dr Xuma
 Xhelo Gubanca of Amavundle Clan (Scotland law graduate and councillor to King Ngangelizwe)
 Lundi Dyasophi
 Sibonisiwe Ndzukuma 
 Prince Soletu Mnqanqeni, Aah Ngweyesizwe!! (Social Science Graduate, University  of Cape Town & Entrepreneur) Engcobo, Embhashe Royal Village (Abathembu Clan). 
 Pelo Siphesihle Gcanga
 Zonwabele Blackie Zola Tshayana (Motivational Speaker, Consultant - Health and Education, Poet, Social Activist, Entrepreneur)
 Lubabalo Oscar Mabuyane (Eastern Cape ANC Provincial Chairperson and 7th Premier)
 Velile Mbethe
 Lwazi Mfundo Lobi
 Kanyiso Kupe 
Chief Zwelakhe Dalasile Of The Amaqwathi Clan
Dr Ntombodidi Tshotsho 
Dr Thembeka Tshotsho-Tshefu
Dr Baba Tshotsho

Location

References

Populated places in the Engcobo Local Municipality
Populated places established in 1881